is a Japanese former professional boxer who competed from 1994 to 2012. He held the WBC super-bantamweight title from 2008 to 2012, and challenged for the WBO and [[The Ring (magazine)|The Ring]] super-bantamweight titles in his final-fight. Nishioka is known for his series of fights against Veeraphol Nakonluang-Promotion, with two of their four encounters ending in draws. Unlike many of Japan's other world champions, Nishioka willingly fought outside of his own country.

Early life and career
Nishioka was born in Kakogawa, Hyōgo, Japan, in July 1976, and has one younger sister. He started boxing at age ten when he was in the fifth grade of elementary school on the recommendation of his father who runs a tavern. He compiled an amateur record of 10–2. Since before his professional debut, Nishioka had served as a sparring partner of the reigning WBC bantamweight champion Yasuei Yakushiji.

Nicknamed "Speed King", Nishioka won his professional debut by a first-round knockout in Himeji, Hyōgo, on December 11, 1994. But he was knocked out in the fourth round of the next fight at the Korakuen Hall, and was carried out on a stretcher. Nishioka won the annual Japanese boxing series, West Japan Rookie King Tournament in the super bantamweight division at the Osaka Prefectural Gymnasium in September 1995. Winning over the Central Japan rookie king in the next fight at the Nagoya Civic Assembly Hall, he fought against the rookie king of the Western part of Japan in Fukuoka in December of the same year. Though Nishioka was convinced of his victory, the judges were in favor of his opponent.

During his early career, Nishioka was expected to be Joichiro Tatsuyoshi's successor, and served as his sparring partner for two years since 1996. Nishioka went down a weight division to capture the Japanese bantamweight title at the Osaka Municipal Central Gymnasium on December 29, 1998, the last day when Tatsuyoshi was a world champion. Although Nishioka was knocked down once when away from the clinch in the first round, he twice floored his opponent while wearing a confident and defiant smile in the second round to be crowned, and defended the title twice before returning it.

Rivalry with Sahaprom, injuries
In June 2000, Nishioka challenged the WBC bantamweight champion Veeraphol Nakonluang-Promotion in Takasago, Hyōgo, and lost via a unanimous decision. He had belonged to the JM Kakogawa Gym until that fight, and has been managed by the Teiken Boxing Gym in Tokyo under Akihiko Honda's supervision and  Yūichi Kasai's guidance since September 2000.

The second world title shot was watched by 12,000 spectators at the Yokohama Arena in September 2001, and was a very close fight in which the scores were 115–113 for Nishioka, 116–113 for Veeraphol, and 114–114 even. Nishioka suffered an Achilles tendon rupture twice during that year. In December 2002, he returned to the ring for the first time in fifteen months to gain a first-round knockout victory at the Mandalay Bay Resort and Casino in Las Vegas, Nevada. However his style was totally different from the previous one. He challenged Veeraphol for the third time at the Ryōgoku Kokugikan in October 2003, but the result was a draw by a hometown decision. In his fourth world title shot against Veeraphol in March 2004, he lost via a unanimous decision by a wide margin of points at the Saitama Super Arena.

After that defeat in 2004, Nishioka received a greeting card, with the Japanese message  written by painter Atsumu Yamamoto; the phrase can be interpreted as: "No way to live other than this way", which encouraged him. While Honda advised him to retire, and set subsequent matches to convince him, Nishioka, who had remained aloof and proud as a boxer and had not trained with gym mates, decided to run with younger fellow boxers to strengthen his mind. He also attended Marco Antonio Barrera's training camp on the West Coast of the United States.

Marriage and recovery
Nishioka got married in January 2005, and they have a daughter born in 2006. Nishioka went back to the super bantamweight division, and continued fighting mainly in Japan, besides a second-round technical knockout victory at the Palais des Sports in Marseille, France, in April 2005, and a fourth-round knockout victory (with a left-hand punch to the body) at The Joint in Las Vegas, Nevada, in November 2006. Nishioka noticed that the former motion before the Achilles tendon injury came back in the pivot of his ankle from around the fight in November 2006. His trainer Kasai also felt that Nishioka's foot recovered to its original condition, and his thinking and fighting style progressed significantly from around the fight in December 2007 or in April 2008.

After the fight in December 2007, Nishioka stayed at his wife's parents' home in Amagasaki, Hyōgo. With the consent of his wife and her father, he decided to live separate from his wife and daughter to focus on boxing alone. When he returned to Tokyo and told Honda about it, he was told that the possibility that his fifth world title was determined to be less than ten percent and that he should bring her back immediately. The discomfort in his foot completely disappeared in the beginning of 2008. From that year, he is registered as a resident in Amagasaki where his own house has been completed in 2012. Usually, Nishioka trains while living a solo life in Tokyo, and his wife and daughter live in Amagasaki. After each of Nishioka's fights, he spends time together with his family in Amagasaki. Nishioka later recalled that transfer to the Teiken Boxing Gym and marriage have been his major turning points.

WBC super bantamweight champion
Nishioka captured the WBC super bantamweight interim title against Thai's Napapol Kiatisakchokchai at the Pacifico Yokohama on September 15, 2008. Just after the fight, Veeraphol whom he fought four times, and who served as Napapol's special coach, climbed into the ring to congratulate Nishioka. Nishioka inherited the fullversion of the WBC super bantamweight title on December 18 of that year, when its previous holder, Israel Vázquez, was stripped for medical reasons. He defended that title by knocking out Mexico's Genaro García in the final round, again at the Pacifico Yokohama on January 3, 2009.

On May 23, 2009, Nishioka successfully defended his title against Jhonny González in front of 12,000 spectators mostly cheering for González at the Monterrey Arena in Mexico which had an outbreak of the H1N1 influenza. Nishioka recovered from a knockdown on the first round and went to knock out González in the third round. Nishioka's left blows including his left crosses have often been called Monster Left from those days. He succeeded in the third defense via a third-round technical knockout (TKO) against Ivan Hernández at the Yoyogi National Gymnasium on October 10 of the same year. Nishioka was presented with the 2009 WBC Knockout of the Year. He defeated Filipino Balweg Bangoyan via a fifth-round technical knockout at the Nippon Budokan on April 30, 2010 to have four consecutive title defenses all by knockout. The effects of trunk strengthening from the late 2009 have appeared, his balance has improved markedly.

On October 24 of the same year, Nishioka fought a mandatory bout against Rendall Munroe at the Ryōgoku Kokugikan, and defeated him by a convincing unanimous decision to extend his defending streak to five matches. Nishioka strongly desired a unification match with the other organizations' champion especially after that. When Nishioka was named Japan's Fighter of the Year in 2010, he received a video message from Fernando Montiel demanding a fight at the awards ceremony in January 2011. Nishioka said he was willing to fight anytime soon afterward and his camp intended to arrange a match, but the contract was not finalized as Montiel lost to Nonito Donaire in February. On April 8, 2011, he knocked out Argentina's Mauricio Javier Muñoz in the ninth round in his sixth defense which was moved from the Ryōgoku Kokugikan in Tokyo to the World Memorial Hall in Kobe due to the Tōhoku earthquake.

In his seventh defense on October 1, 2011, Nishioka fought against Rafael Márquez, who had been marked as one of his targets from around October 2003, at the MGM Grand Marquee Ballroom in Las Vegas. Márquez's long, well-extended jabs were effective in the early rounds. At the end of four rounds, all three judges scored it identically at 39–37 in favor of Márquez. Nishioka fully concentrated every second from the beginning of the fight. He landed well-timed left and right blows while circling right to nullify Márquez's right cross, and although not in principle for a southpaw, often circling left to negate Márquez's left hook and to throw his quicker and sharper angled left, to win the bout by a unanimous decision. Although Márquez did not admit his defeat and demanded a rematch, there was no disgust nor booing among the spectators.

In March 2012, Nishioka competed with Yuriorkis Gamboa for The Ring pound for pound Top 10, and barely missed it. The WBC granted Nishioka the Emeritus Champion status on March 15, 2012.

Nishioka lost to Nonito Donaire by technical knockout in 1:54 in the ninth round at the Home Depot Center in Carson, California on October 13, 2012. He had been ranked the number one super bantamweight in the world by The Ring'', but was dropped to number three after the fight.

Retirement
About a month following his bout with Donaire, Nishioka announced his retirement from boxing.

Professional boxing record

See also
List of WBC world champions
List of super bantamweight boxing champions
List of Japanese boxing world champions
Boxing in Japan

References

Bibliography

External links
 

 

1976 births
Living people
People from Kakogawa, Hyōgo
Super-bantamweight boxers
Southpaw boxers
World Boxing Council champions
World super-bantamweight boxing champions
World boxing champions
Japanese male boxers
Bantamweight boxers